Bradley Robert Gunter (born 5 December 1993) is a Canadian volleyball player. He is a member of the Canada men's national volleyball team and Bulgarian club VC Hebar Pazardzhik.

Career
Bradley Gunter began his post-secondary volleyball career with Thompson Rivers University WolfPack in 2011. He signed with Estonian club BIGBANK Tartu in 2016, before signing for Polish club Lotos Trefl Gdańsk in 2017. At 2018 Bradley Gunter signed the Bulgarian ambitious project of VC Hebar Pazardzhik.

National Team
Bradley first joined the national team program in 2013, as a member of the squad that competed in the 2013 FIVB Volleyball Men's U21 World Championship. He joined the senior squad in 2017 as a member of the World League roster.

Sporting achievements

Clubs

National championships
 2016/2017  Baltic Volleyball League, with BIGBANK Tartu
 2017/2018  Polish Cup, with Trefl Gdańsk
 2018/2019  Bulgaria CUP, with VC Hebar Pazardzhik

References

Canadian men's volleyball players
Place of birth missing (living people)
1993 births
Living people
People from Comox, British Columbia
Sportspeople from British Columbia